Bronson Jr./Sr. High School is a public school located in Bronson, Michigan. It serves grades 6–12.  It is a part of the Branch Intermediate School District.

History 
Bronson Jr./Sr. High School was built in 1964. At first it accommodated grades 9–12. In 1980 the school made a transfer of 7th–8th graders from Bronson Middle School (which later became Chicago Street School). In 1998 a science/technology addition was built and completed, and in 2002 a weight and wrestling/all-purpose room was added.

Present Day 
Currently, the school provides education for students from sixth grade to twelfth grade. Students from the school can go to the Branch Area Career Center part-time if they are a Junior or a Senior.

Athletics
Bronson is a Class C school and a member of the Big 8 Conference. Sports offered include tennis, track, basketball, golf, volleyball, wrestling, softball, baseball, cheerleading, and football.

References 

Public high schools in Michigan
Schools in Branch County, Michigan
Educational institutions established in 1964
Public middle schools in Michigan
1964 establishments in Michigan